Christopher Cory Gomez (born June 16, 1971) is a former Major League Baseball infielder. He bats and throws right-handed.

College career
He played park league baseball in Lakewood for Mike Fahey. After playing baseball at Lakewood High School in Lakewood, California Gomez originally went to college at Loyola Marymount University, but transferred to Long Beach State and played baseball there in 1992. He was a selection for the All-America Team while at Long Beach State.

Professional career
Gomez was originally drafted by the California Angels in 1989 in the 37th round of the amateur draft, but he turned down the contract. He was not drafted until June 1, 1992, when he was signed by Detroit in the 3rd round of the amateur draft. His contract was purchased from the Triple-A Toledo Mud Hens on July 19, 1993, and he made his big league debut that night against the Minnesota Twins. His first major league hit was a triple on July 22 off Kansas City Royals pitcher Frank DiPino. He started in 23 games at shortstop and 17 at second base that year. After the season, Tigers news broadcasters elected him the Rookie of the Year.

1994 was Gomez's first full major league season. He was on the Topps All-Rookie team at shortstop. 27 of his 76 hits were extra base hits. His first multi-homer game was on May 7 against the Mariners. Gomez finished the year with a .257 batting average, 8 home runs, and 53 RBI. In 1995, Gomez hit career highs in home runs with 11, runs with 49, hits with 96, doubles with 20, as well as 41 walks. He ranked 4th on the team in RBI, hits, and doubles. In 123 games, Gomez only made 15 errors.

Gomez started out the 1996 season with the Tigers, but was traded along with catcher John Flaherty to the San Diego Padres for catcher Brad Ausmus, shortstop Andújar Cedeño, and minor leaguer Russ Spears. Gomez finished the year with a .252 average, 4 home runs and 45 RBI. He batted .253 with 5 home runs and 54 RBI, and also swiped 5 bases, in 1997.

Gomez was the shortstop for the National league champion Padres in 1998. In the 1998 World Series he batted .364 as the Padres went on to lose the series to the New York Yankees.

After the 2004 season, Gomez was signed by the Baltimore Orioles. However, they did not protect him for the Rule 5 draft, and he was selected by the Philadelphia Phillies. When the team found out Plácido Polanco was remaining with them, they allowed the Orioles to buy him back.

On August 9, 2007, he was claimed off waivers by the Cleveland Indians.

On December 4, 2007, he signed with the Pittsburgh Pirates.

On January 9, 2009, Gomez signed a minor league deal with the Baltimore Orioles, and was given a non-roster invitation to spring training. However, he did not make the team and was released on April 1. On January 31, 2010 Gomez officially retired from MLB.

References

External links

1971 births
Living people
Aberdeen IronBirds players
American expatriate baseball players in Canada
Baltimore Orioles players
Baseball players at the 1991 Pan American Games
Baseball players from Los Angeles
Cleveland Indians players
Detroit Tigers players
Durham Bulls players
Long Beach State Dirtbags baseball players
Major League Baseball infielders
Minnesota Twins players
Pan American Games bronze medalists for the United States
Pan American Games medalists in baseball
Pittsburgh Pirates players
Portland Beavers players
San Diego Padres players
Tampa Bay Devil Rays players
Toledo Mud Hens players
Toronto Blue Jays players
Medalists at the 1991 Pan American Games